The King of Pigs is a 2011 South Korean adult animated psychological drama thriller film directed by Yeon Sang-ho. It was Sang-ho's debut film, and was based on many of his former experiences in high school. The film was selected to be screened in the Directors' Fortnight section at the 2012 Cannes Film Festival, making it the first Korean film of its kind to be screened in Cannes. The film was highly polarizing, but was mostly praised for its realistic portrayal of bullying, violence, and systemic poverty and won three awards at the 2011 Busan International Film Festival. As the first adult animated film produced in South Korea, it, along with the film at the same year, Leafie, A Hen into the Wild, was responsible for South Korea's increase in legitimacy in the animation industry.

Cast
 Yang Ik-june as Jung Jong-suk
 Oh Jung-se as Hwang Kyung-min
 Kim Hye-na as Kim Chul
 Kim Kkot-bi as young Jong-suk
 Park Hee-von as young Kyung-min

Synopsis
After his business goes bankrupt, thirty-something Kyung-min (Oh Jung-se) kills his wife impulsively. Hiding his anger, he seeks out his former middle school classmate Jong-suk (Yang Ik-june). Jong-suk now works as a ghostwriter for an autobiography, but he dreams of writing his own novel. For the first time in 15 years they meet. Kyung-min and Jong-suk both hide their own current situations and begin to talk about their middle school days.

At their middle school, they were classified by their wealth, grades as well as stature. Kyung-min and Jong-suk were at the bottom. They were called "pigs" and were bullied by a ruling class known as "dogs". When they were called pigs they got angry, but couldn't do anything against the dogs. Then a King of Pigs appears – Kim Chul (Kim Hye-na). Kyung-min and Jong-suk began to rely on Kim Chul.

Whilst in the present Kyung-min leads Jong-suk to their middle school grounds to disclose to Jong-suk the shocking truth about what happened to Chul 15 years ago.

Reception
Maggie Lee of The Hollywood Reporter wrote that while the film contains a high level of stylised violence, "it is not an artistic exercise. Pain is represented as something very real, enough to make one wince. ... The King of Pigs captures many subtle class gradations in Korean society and shows how it corrupts human interaction." Lee also wrote: "Technically adept and highly cinematic in its storytelling, the  production proves that it is still possible to produce quality animation with a modest budget." Peter Bradshaw of The Guardian awarded the film four stars out of five, and called it "a strangely gripping and upsetting movie."

The review aggregator website Rotten Tomatoes reported that 72% of critics have given the film a positive review based on 18 reviews, with an average rating of 6.31/10.

Korean cinema website KoreanScreen gave the movie a 4 out of 5 stars, writing, "Bleak, angry and utterly uncompromising, this animated view of hierarchical high schools delivers a relentless break-time punch to the stomach." On 12 April 2021, KoreanScreen listed The King of Pigs as the 71st best Korean film of all time in their list of 100 Greatest Korean Films Ever, a list polled by 158 international film critics from 28 countries, making it the only animated film in the list. The list wrote, "Sometimes films are necessarily bleak in order to imprint their message on your mind. This is a lesson on bullying and hierarchical high school environments you are unlikely to ever forget."

Web series adaptation 
A web series adaptation of the same title, produced by Studio Dragon and Hidden Sequence, premiered on the online streaming service TVING on March 18, 2022.

See also
 2011 in film
 Cinema of South Korea
 List of animated feature films of 2011

References

External links
 
 
 

2011 films
South Korean animated films
2010s Korean-language films
Films about bullying
Films about school violence
Films directed by Yeon Sang-ho
2011 directorial debut films
2011 drama films
South Korean films based on actual events
2010s South Korean films